Harold Donachie (born 16 April 1964) is a South African cricketer. He played in fourteen first-class and seven List A matches from 1988/89 to 1994/95.

References

External links
 

1964 births
Living people
South African cricketers
Eastern Province cricketers
Western Province cricketers
Cricketers from Cape Town